The Easton Area Public Library serves the community of Easton in Northampton County, Pennsylvania. The present Carnegie library was predated by a community library constructed by the Easton Library Company in 1811. With a grant in 1901 for $57,000 by industrialist Andrew Carnegie a new library began construction at 515 Church Street and was completed in 1903. The library system consists of the Easton library serving as the headquarters, and the Palmer Branch located at 1 Weller Place, Palmer Township which was constructed in 1986.

The main Easton branch contains the Marx Room, which was added in 1985 to serve as a local history room. This addition houses the largest collection of local history and genealogy in northeastern Pennsylvania with roughly 15,000 historical texts and materials about the Easton area and Northampton County. In addition, it holds the oldest known map of Easton, Pennsylvania dated to the late 1700s, as well as the original Flag of Easton which was hoisted when the Declaration of Independence was publicly read in Easton on July 8, 1776.

History

1811–1901
The Easton Library Company was founded on January 16, 1811, when 100 shares of stock were offered to the public. The company was founded in order to provide books to the citizens of Easton, however only patrons who supported the library with a yearly subscription fee were allowed access to the collection. By 1815, the company had raised enough money to construct a building, known as Library Hall, on land donated by resident Samuel Sitgreaves. This location on the corner of North Second and Church Street was used for the next 90 years. During the Civil War, the subscription service suffered due to a high number of Easton citizens enlisting in the Union Army. To account for the decrease in library use, the Library Company deeded the building to the Easton School Board in 1864. When the school board took over operation of the library, high school students were permitted to borrow books without a subscription.

As the Easton Library Company restricted free library access to the general public, the women of Lehigh Valley founded the Easton Library Association in 1895, with the goal of establishing a free public library for those who could not afford an annual library subscription. Funding for the new library was financed by the school board and became open to all residents in the city, regardless of income. On March 30, 1896, the Library Association opened their first library which was available for three hours every weekday afternoon from 2:00pm to 5:00pm including extra evening hours from 7:30pm to 9:00pm on Thursdays and Saturdays. Due to the library's high level of interest and increased number of visitors, by 1901 the Easton Library Association and Easton Library Company combined their collections. Now as a singular free public library, this change made the city eligible to apply for a library grant from the state of Pennsylvania.

Carnegie Library construction

At the turn of the 20th century, industrialist Andrew Carnegie began funding dozens of public libraries in Pennsylvania. In 1901, the Carnegie Corporation received plans from the Easton Library Association asking for a donation for a new building to be constructed on Church Street. Included in the plans were a fireproof vault for the protection of books of rare and historic value, and an auditorium with a seating capacity of 400 to 500 people. The final building proposal would be large enough to house 34,500 volumes. After reviewing the plans, Carnegie donated $50,000 (equivalent to $ in  dollars), under the condition that the citizens of Easton provide land for the construction of the library, and allocate a $5,000 annual maintenance and upkeep fee ( dollars) through the city government. The city ultimately agreed to fund the daily expenses and construction began.

On October 28, 1903, the Carnegie library was completed and dedicated to the community as the Easton Public Library. At the time of opening the library contained 14,000 books and was served by librarian Henry F. Marx. Due to rapid growth and great public interest the new library quickly found itself at full capacity and in need of additional space for a quickly growing book collection. The Easton Library Association reached out to Carnegie again, in 1911, to petition for funding to add an addition to the main library and received a second grant for $10,500 ( dollars), to create additional storage space on the north side of the building. This renovation increased the capacity of the library to 80,000 volumes. One more addition, in 1941, added lofted stacks to again increase the storage capacity for books.

1962–1985
By 1962, the State of Pennsylvania passed legislation to create district library centers. These centers were prominent libraries chosen for their size and influence that could supplement library services and offer assistance to other smaller libraries operating in their counties while providing their own communities with access to a free public library. By 1963, the Easton Area Public Library surpassed the minimum requirements to become designated as one of Pennsylvania's first district library centers, servicing Monroe and Northampton counties. Created by legislation in 1962, District Library Centers were designated libraries

The final addition to the library came in 1968, which added a large building to the east side to be used as additional floor space for offices, meeting areas, and book stacks.

Creation of the Marx Room

In 1985, the Easton Library Association noticed their historic book collection was at risk of acidification and began a $300,000 ( dollars), campaign to renovate what was the bookmobile room into a climate controlled history room. To pay for the new room the Friends of the Library contacted the National Endowment for the Humanities and secured a $100,000 ( dollars), grant to assist in fundraising. Because of its rich collection of books dating to the early 1800s and founding of Northampton County, the Endowment recognized the public library as "one of the most extensive research libraries in the East," and was one of only two or three libraries across the country to secure a grant. This renovation, completed in 1987, resulted in the Marx Room named after the first librarian of the Easton Public Library, Henry F. Marx.

The Marx Room now contains many of Easton's most historic relics. On display is the oldest known map of the area dating back to the late 1700s, and hand-drawn by Charles de Krafft who surveyed the area for Thomas Penn, son of Pennsylvania's founder William Penn. The map outlines the original  of Easton which Thomas Penn received in 1736 in order to keep track of who was living on each plot of land, and for town lots to be rented out to farmers and other settlers moving to the region.

The Marx Room also holds what is considered by many to be the original Flag of Easton that was raised during the reading of the Declaration of Independence on July 8, 1776. It was also gifted to Captain Abraham Horn's Company as they left to march towards Camp DuPont, Marcus Hook during the War of 1812. When the company came home after the war, in 1821, they presented the flag to the library for safekeeping, where it has since remained.

1986–present
The following year, 1986, saw the opening of the Easton Area Public Library's second permanent branch located at 1 Weller Place on the opposite side of the city. Named the Palmer Branch, this location replaced a temporary service branch that was being run out of a trailer along Division Street. The plans for the new $400,000 ( dollars), library had been initiated in 1983, and money was raised by the township Business, Industrial and Professional Association Incorporated. The City of Easton additionally received $200,000 ( dollars), in funding from the federal library construction grant.

In 2001, the Easton Library joined the neighboring Allentown Public Library, Bethlehem Public Library, and Moravian College Library in order to create the Lehigh Valley Library System. This consortium serves roughly 660,000 people in the Lehigh Valley.

References

External links
 EAPL official catalog

Carnegie libraries in Pennsylvania
Library buildings completed in 1903
Public libraries in Pennsylvania